Luis Carlos Ovalle Victoria (born 7 September 1988) is a Panamanian football defender who currently plays for C.D. Plaza Amador.

Club career
Ovalle came through the Sporting San Miguelito youth system and made his debut for their senior side in 2004. In 2008, he joined compatriot Felipe Baloy at Mexican side Monterrey only to return to Panama to play for Chorrillo and later for Sporting San Miguelito again. In June 2012, Sporting loaned him to Colombian club Patriotas Boyaca.

In January 2013, Ovalle crossed borders again when he joined compatriot Gabriel Torres at Venezuelan outfit Zamora.

International career
He was part of the Panama U-20 squad that participated in the 2007 FIFA World Youth Cup in Canada.

Ovalle made his senior debut for Panama in a December 2010 friendly match against Honduras and has, as of 10 June 2015, earned a total of four caps, scoring no goals.

In May 2018, he was named in Panama's preliminary 35 man squad for the 2018 FIFA World Cup in Russia.

Career statistics

International

References

External links

Profile – Zamora FC
possofutbol.com – Luis Ovalle

1988 births
Living people
Sportspeople from Panama City
Association football defenders
Panamanian footballers
Sporting San Miguelito players
Unión Deportivo Universitario players
Patriotas Boyacá footballers
Zamora FC players
Deportes Tolima footballers
C.D. Olimpia players
Atlético Venezuela C.F. players
Deportivo Táchira F.C. players
C.D. Plaza Amador players
Liga Panameña de Fútbol players
Categoría Primera A players
Venezuelan Primera División players
Panamanian expatriate footballers
2017 Copa Centroamericana players
2017 CONCACAF Gold Cup players
2018 FIFA World Cup players
Panama international footballers
Expatriate footballers in Mexico
Expatriate footballers in Colombia
Expatriate footballers in Venezuela
Expatriate footballers in Honduras
Panamanian expatriate sportspeople in Mexico
Panamanian expatriate sportspeople in Colombia
Panamanian expatriate sportspeople in Venezuela